Liotyphlops schubarti is a species of snake in the family Anomalepididae. The species is endemic to Brazil.

Etymology
The specific name, schubarti, is in honor of German-born Brazilian zoologist Otto Schubart.

Geographic range
L. schubarti is found in the Brazilian state of São Paulo.

Habitat
The preferred natural habitat of L. schubarti is forest.

Reproduction
L. schubarti is oviparous.

References

Further reading
Dixon JR, Kofron CP (1983). "The Central and South American Anomalepid Snakes of the Genus Liotyphlops ". Amphibia-Reptilia 4 (2): 241–264.
Freiberg M (1982). Snakes of South America. Hong Kong: T.F.H. Publications, Inc. 189 pp. . (Liotyphlops schubarti, p. 86).
Vanzolini PE (1948). "Notas sobre os ofídios e lagartos de Cachoeira de Emas, no município de Pirassununga, Estado São Paulo ". Revista Brasileira de Biologia, Rio de Janeiro 8: 377–400. (Liotyphlops schubarti, new species, p. 379). (in Portuguese).

Anomalepididae
Endemic fauna of Brazil
Reptiles described in 1948